Trust Bank Limited may refer to:

Trust Bank Limited (Gambia), a bank in Gambia
The Trust Bank Limited, a bank in Ghana
Trust Bank Limited (Bangladesh), a bank in Bangladesh